John Faulkner (born 1954) is an Australian Senator and member of the federal cabinet.

John Faulkner may also refer to:

 John Alfred Faulkner (1857–1931), American church historian
 John Faulkner (racing driver) (born 1952), New Zealand-Australian racing driver
 John Pascoe Fawkner (1792–1869), Australian pioneer
 John Faulkner (actor) (1872–1934), Australian actor of theatre and film
 John Faulkner (footballer) (1948–2017), English professional footballer
 John Faulkner (author) (1901–1963), American author
 John Lees Faulkner (1812–1882), New Zealand trader, shipbuilder and farmer
 John Faulkner (Mississippi politician) (born 1965), member of the Mississippi House of Representatives